Dunluce is a civil parish in County Antrim, Northern Ireland.

See also
List of civil parishes of County Antrim

References

 

Civil parishes of County Antrim